The men's eight (M8+) competition at the 2008 Summer Olympics in Beijing was held from August 11 to August 17 at the Shunyi Olympic Rowing-Canoeing Park. Seven of nine national teams returned from the men's eight competition at the 2004 Summer Olympics to compete again, joined by the host nation. A total of 75 competitors took part, with three substitutions made during the competition. The event was won by Canada, the nation's first victory in the men's eight since 1992 and third overall (tying Great Britain for second-most, behind the United States' 12). The British team took silver, with the Americans finishing with the bronze medal.

Background

This was the 25th appearance of the event. Rowing had been on the programme in 1896 but was cancelled due to bad weather. The men's eight has been held every time that rowing has been contested, beginning in 1900.

The field was competitive. The top two teams were both from North America: the United States was the reigning Olympic champion, the 2005 World Champion, and the 2007 Pan American champion; Canada was the reigning (2007) World Champion. Germany was also strong, winning the 2006 World Championship and being the runner-up in 2007.

For the second consecutive Games, no nations made their debut in the event. The United States made its 22nd appearance, most among nations to that point.

Qualification

Nations had been limited to one boat each since 1920. The 8 qualifiers were:

 7 boats from the 2007 World Championships
 1 boat from the Final Qualification Regatta

Competition format

The 2008 Summer Olympics M8+ rowing competition consisted of eight teams, split into two four-team heats.  Each team fielded a boat crewed by eight rowers and a coxswain. Each rower used a single oar, with four oars on each side of the boat. The winner of each heat qualified for the "Final A" (or medal final). The remaining six teams competed in the repechage round, with the top four from that round qualifying for the "Final A" round. The last two teams in the repechage competed in the "Final B".

The final ranking for rowing at the 2008 Summer Olympics was based on the order of finish in the two finals. The top three of the "Final A" teams earned Olympic medals for placing first, second, and third, while the remaining "Final A" teams placed fourth through sixth, according to their "Final A" finish. The "Final B" competition determined who places seventh and eight in the event's final ranking.

Schedule

All times are China Standard Time (UTC+8)

Results

Semifinals

Semifinal 1

Semifinal 2

Repechage

Finals

Final B

Final A

The winners of the heats, Canada and Great Britain, took the gold and silver medals; the winner of the repechage, United States, took the bronze.

Canada's Olympic M8+ rowing championship followed their 2007 World M8+ Rowing Championship, making the Canadian crew the first world champion in 35 years to follow up with Olympic gold. Canada finished in 5:23.89, about four seconds off the world record time of 5:19.85 set by the U.S. team during the second heat of the Men's eight at the 2004 Summer Olympics in Athens."

References

Rowing at the 2008 Summer Olympics
Men's events at the 2008 Summer Olympics